Indo-European studies is a field of linguistics and an interdisciplinary field of study dealing with Indo-European languages, both current and extinct. The goal of those engaged in these studies is to amass information about the hypothetical proto-language from which all of these languages are descended, a language dubbed Proto-Indo-European (PIE), and its speakers, the Proto-Indo-Europeans, including their society and Proto-Indo-European mythology. The studies cover where the language originated and how it spread. This article also lists Indo-European scholars, centres, journals and book series.

Naming
The term Indo-European itself now current in English literature, was coined in 1813 by the British scholar Sir Thomas Young, although at that time, there was no consensus as to the naming of the recently discovered language family. However, he seems to have used it as a geographical term, to indicate the newly proposed language family in Eurasia spanning from the Indian subcontinent till the European subcontinent. Among the other names suggested were:

 (C. Malte-Brun, 1810)
Indoeuropean  (Th. Young, 1813)
 (Rasmus C. Rask, 1815)
 (F. Schmitthenner, 1826)
 (Wilhelm von Humboldt, 1827)
 (A. F. Pott, 1840)
 (G. I. Ascoli, 1854)
Aryan  (F. M. Müller, 1861)
  (H. Chavée, 1867).

Rask's japetisk or "Japhetic languages", after the old notion of "Japhetites" and ultimately Japheth, son of the Biblical Noah, parallels the term Semitic, from Noah's son Shem, and Hamitic, from Noah's son Ham. Japhetic and Hamitic are both obsolete, apart from occasional dated use of term "Hamito-Semitic" for the Afro-Asiatic languages.

In English, Indo-German was used by J. C. Prichard in 1826 although he preferred Indo-European. In German literature,  was used by Franz Bopp since 1835, while the term  had already been introduced by Julius von Klapproth in 1823, intending to include the northernmost and the southernmost of the family's branches, as it were as an abbreviation of the full listing of involved languages that had been common in earlier literature. Indo-Germanisch became established by the works of August Friedrich Pott, who understood it to include the easternmost and the westernmost branches, opening the doors to ensuing fruitless discussions whether it should not be Indo-Celtic, or even Tocharo-Celtic.

Similarly,  has now largely replaced the still occasionally encountered  in Dutch scientific literature.

Indo-Hittite is sometimes used for the wider family including Anatolian by those who consider that IE and Anatolian are comparable separate branches.

Study methods

The comparative method was formally developed in the 19th century and applied first to Indo-European languages. The existence of the Proto-Indo-Europeans had been inferred by comparative linguistics as early as 1640, while attempts at an Indo-European proto-language reconstruction date back as far as 1713. However, by the 19th century, still no consensus had been reached about the internal groups of the IE family.

The method of internal reconstruction is used to compare patterns within one dialect, without comparison with other dialects and languages, to try to arrive at an understanding of regularities operating at an earlier stage in that dialect. It has also been used to infer information about earlier stages of PIE than can be reached by the comparative method.

The IE languages are sometimes hypothesized to be part of super-families such as Nostratic or Eurasiatic.

History

Preliminary work
The ancient Greeks were aware that their language had changed since the time of Homer (about 730BC). Aristotle (about 330BC) identified four types of linguistic change: insertion, deletion, transposition and substitution. In the 1st century BC, the Romans were aware of the similarities between Greek and Latin.

In the post-classical West, with the influence of Christianity, language studies were undermined by the naïve attempt to derive all languages from Hebrew since the time of Saint Augustine. Prior studies classified the European languages as Japhetic. One of the first scholars to challenge the idea of a Hebrew root to the languages of Europe was Joseph Scaliger (1540–1609). He identified Greek, Germanic, Romance and Slavic language groups by comparing the word for "God" in various European languages. In 1710, Leibniz applied ideas of gradualism and uniformitarianism to linguistics in a short essay. Like Scaliger, he rejected a Hebrew root, but also rejected the idea of unrelated language groups and considered them all to have a common source.

Around the 12th century, similarities between European languages became recognised. In Iceland, scholars noted the resemblances between Icelandic and English. Gerald of Wales claimed that Welsh, Cornish, and Breton were descendants of a common source. A study of the Insular Celtic languages was carried out by George Buchanan in the 16th century and the first field study was by Edward Llwyd around 1700. He published his work in 1707, shortly after translating a study by Paul-Yves Pezron on Breton.

Grammars of European languages other than Latin and Classical Greek began to be published at the end of the 15th century. This led to comparison between the various languages.

In the 16th century, visitors to India became aware of similarities between Indian and European languages. For example, Filippo Sassetti reported striking resemblances between Sanskrit and Italian.

Early Indo-European studies

In his 1647 essay, Marcus Zuerius van Boxhorn proposed the existence of a primitive common language he called "Scythian". He included in its descendants Dutch, German, Latin, Greek, and Persian, and his posthumously published Originum Gallicarum liber of 1654 added Slavic, Celtic and Baltic. The 1647 essay discusses, as a first, the methodological issues in assigning languages to genetic groups. For example, he observed that loanwords should be eliminated in comparative studies, and also correctly put great emphasis on common morphological systems and irregularity as indicators of relationship. A few years earlier, the Silesian physician Johann Elichmann (1601/1602–1639) already used the expression ex eadem origine (from a common source) in a study published posthumously in 1640. He related European languages to Indo-Iranian languages (which include Sanskrit).

The idea that the first language was Hebrew continued to be advanced for some time: Pierre Besnier (1648–1705) in 1674 published a book which was translated into English the following year: A philosophical essay for the reunion of the languages, or, the art of knowing all by the mastery of one.

Leibniz in 1710 proposed the concept of the so-called Japhetic language group, consisting of languages now known as Indo-European, which he contrasted with the so-called Aramaic languages (now generally known as Semitic).

The concept of actually reconstructing an Indo-European proto-language was suggested by William Wotton in 1713, while showing, among others, that Icelandic ("Teutonic"), the Romance languages and Greek were related.

In 1741 Gottfried Hensel (1687–1767) published a language map of the world in his Synopsis Universae Philologiae. He still believed that all languages were derived from Hebrew.

Mikhail Lomonosov compared numbers and other linguistic features in different languages of the world including Slavic, Baltic ("Kurlandic"), Iranian ("Medic"), Finnish, Chinese, Khoekhoe ("Hottentot") and others. He emphatically expressed the antiquity of the linguistic stages accessible to comparative method in the drafts for his Russian Grammar published in 1755:

Imagine the depth of time when these languages separated! ... Polish and Russian separated so long ago! Now think how long ago [this happened to] Kurlandic! Think when [this happened to] Latin, Greek, German, and Russian! Oh, great antiquity!

Gaston-Laurent Coeurdoux (1691–1779) sent a Mémoire to the French Académie des inscriptions et belles-lettres in 1767 in which he demonstrated the similarity between the Sanskrit, Latin, Greek, German and Russian languages.

Despite the above, the discovery of the genetic relationship of the whole family of Indo-European languages is often attributed to Sir William Jones, a British judge in India who in a 1786 lecture (published 1788) observed that

The Sanskrit language, whatever be its antiquity, is of a wonderful structure; more perfect than the Greek, more copious than the Latin, and more exquisitely refined than either, yet bearing to both of them a stronger affinity, both in the roots of verbs and the forms of grammar, than could possibly have been produced by accident; so strong indeed, that no philologer could examine them all three, without believing them to have sprung from some common source, which, perhaps, no longer exists.

In his 1786 The Sanskrit Language, Jones postulated a proto-language uniting six branches: Sanskrit (i.e. Indo-Aryan), Persian (i.e. Iranian), Greek, Latin, Germanic and Celtic. In many ways his work was less accurate than his predecessors', as he erroneously included Egyptian, Japanese and Chinese in the Indo-European languages, while omitting Hindi.

In 1814 the young Dane Rasmus Christian Rask submitted an entry to an essay contest on Icelandic history, in which he concluded that the Germanic languages were (as we would put it) in the same language family as Greek, Latin, Slavic, and Lithuanian. He was in doubt about Old Irish, eventually concluding that it did not belong with the others (he later changed his mind), and further decided that Finnish and Hungarian were related but in a different family, and that "Greenlandic" (Kalaallisut) represented yet a third. He was unfamiliar with Sanskrit at the time. Later, however, he learned Sanskrit, and published some of the earliest Western work on ancient Iranian languages.

August Schleicher was the first scholar to compose a tentative reconstructed text in the extinct common source that Van Boxhorn and later scholars had predicted (see: Schleicher's fable). The reconstructed Proto-Indo-European language (PIE) represents, by definition, the common language of the Proto-Indo-Europeans. This early phase culminates in Franz Bopp's Comparative Grammar of 1833.

Later Indo-European studies
The classical phase of Indo-European comparative linguistics leads from Bopp to August Schleicher's 1861 Compendium and up to Karl Brugmann's 5-volume Grundriss (outline of Indo-European languages) published from 1886 to 1893.  Brugmann's Neogrammarian re-evaluation of the field and Ferdinand de Saussure's proposal of the concept of "consonantal schwa" (which later evolved into the laryngeal theory) may be considered the beginning of "contemporary" Indo-European studies. The Indo-European proto-language as described in the early 1900s in its main aspects is still accepted today, and the work done in the 20th century has been cleaning up and systematizing, as well as the incorporation of new language material, notably the Anatolian and Tocharian branches unknown in the 19th century, into the Indo-European framework.

Notably, the laryngeal theory, in its early forms barely noticed except as a clever analysis, became mainstream after the 1927 discovery by Jerzy Kuryłowicz of the survival of at least some of these hypothetical phonemes in Anatolian. Julius Pokorny in 1959 published his Indogermanisches etymologisches Wörterbuch, an updated and slimmed-down reworking of the three-volume Vergleichendes Wörterbuch der indogermanischen Sprachen of Alois Walde and Julius Pokorny (1927–32). Both of these works aim to provide an overview of the lexical knowledge accumulated until the early 20th century, but with only stray comments on the structure of individual forms; in Pokorny 1959, then-recent trends of morphology and phonology (e.g., the laryngeal theory), go unacknowledged, and he largely ignores Anatolian and Tocharian data.

The generation of Indo-Europeanists active in the last third of the 20th century, such as Oswald Szemerényi, Calvert Watkins, Warren Cowgill, Jochem Schindler, Helmut Rix, developed a better understanding of morphology and, in the wake of Kuryłowicz's 1956 L'apophonie en indo-européen, ablaut. Rix's Lexikon der indogermanischen Verben appeared in 1997 as a first step towards a modernization of Pokorny's dictionary; corresponding tomes addressing the noun, Nomina im Indogermanischen Lexikon, appeared in 2008, and pronouns and particles, Lexikon der indogermanischen Partikeln und Pronominalstämme, in 2014. Current efforts are focused on a better understanding of the relative chronology within the proto-language, aiming at distinctions of "early", "middle" and "late", or "inner" and "outer" PIE dialects, but a general consensus has yet to form. From the 1960s, knowledge of Anatolian began to be of a certainty sufficient stage to allow it to influence the image of the proto-language (see also Indo-Hittite).

Such attempts at recovering a sense of historical depth in PIE have been combined with efforts towards linking the history of the language with archaeology, notably with the Kurgan hypothesis. J. P. Mallory's 1989 In Search of the Indo-Europeans and 1997 Encyclopedia of Indo-European Culture gives an overview of this. Purely linguistic research was bolstered by attempts to reconstruct the culture and mythology of the Proto-Indo-Europeans by scholars such as Georges Dumézil, as well as by archaeology (e. g. Marija Gimbutas, Colin Renfrew) and genetics (e. g. Luigi Luca Cavalli-Sforza). These speculations about the realia of Proto-Indo-European culture are however not part of the field of comparative linguistics, but rather a sister-discipline.

Criticism
Marxists such as Bruce Lincoln (himself an Indo-Europeanist) have criticized aspects of Indo-European studies believed to be overly reactionary. In the 1980s, Georges Dumézil and Indo-European studies in general came under fire from historian Arnaldo Momigliano, who accused Indo-European studies of being created by fascists bent on combating "Judeo-Christian" society. Momigliano was himself a veteran member of the National Fascist Party, but was not open about this. Edgar C. Polomé, an Indo-Europeanist and  co-editor of Mankind Quarterly, described Momigliano and Lincoln's criticism as "unfair and vicious", and connected criticism of Indo-European studies with Marxism and political correctness.

More recently, the Swedish Marxist historian Stefan Arvidsson has followed up on Momigliano's criticism of Indo-European studies. Arvidsson considers Indo-European studies to be a pseudoscientific field, and has described Indo-European mythology as "the most sinister mythology of modern times". In his works, Arvidsson has sought to expose what he considers to be fascist political sympathies of Indo-Europeanists, and suggested that such an exposure may result in the abolition ("Ragnarök") of the concept of Indo-European mythology.

List of Indo-European scholars
(historical; see below for contemporary IE studies)

 Friedrich Schlegel (1772–1829)
 Jakob Grimm (1785–1863)
 Rasmus Rask (1787–1832)
 Franz Bopp (1791–1867)
 August Friedrich Pott (1802–1887)
 Theodor Benfey (1809–1881)
 Hermann Grassmann (1809–1877)
 Otto von Böhtlingk (1815–1904)
 Rudolf von Raumer (1815–1876)
 Georg Curtius (1820–1885)
 August Schleicher (1821–1868)
 Max Müller (1823–1900)
 William Dwight Whitney (1827–1894)
 August Fick (1833–1916)
 August Leskien (1840–1916)
 Franz Kielhorn (1840–1908)
 Wilhelm Scherer (1841–1886)
 Berthold Delbrück (1842–1922)
 Vilhelm Thomsen (1842–1927)
 Johannes Schmidt (1843–1901)
 Ernst Windisch (1844–1918)
 K. A. Verner (1846–1896)
 Hermann Osthoff (1846–1909)
 Karl Brugmann (1849–1919)
 Hermann Möller (1850–1923)
 Jakob Wackernagel (1853–1938)
 Otto Schrader (1855–1919)
 Ferdinand de Saussure (1857–1913)
 Wilhelm August Streitberg (1864–1925)
 Hermann Hirt (1865–1936)
 Antoine Meillet (1866–1936)
 Holger Pedersen (1867–1953)
 Alois Walde (1869–1924)
 Eduard Schwyzer (1874–1943)
 Ferdinand Sommer (1875–1962)
 Bedřich Hrozný (1879–1952)
 Franklin Edgerton (1885–1963)
 Julius Pokorny (1887–1970)
 Manu Leumann (1889–1977)
 Milan Budimir (1891–1975)
 Jerzy Kuryłowicz (1895–1978)
 Roman Jakobson (1896–1982) 
 Giacomo Devoto (1897-1974)
 Georges Dumézil (1898–1986)
 Christian Stang (1900–1977)
 Émile Benveniste (1902–1976)
 Ernst Risch (1911–1988)
 Oswald Szemerényi (1913–1996)
 Karl Hoffmann (1915–1996)
 Georg Renatus Solta (1915–2005)
 Winfred P. Lehmann (1916–2007)
 Edgar Charles Polomé (1920–2000)
 Marija Gimbutas (1921–1994)
 Ladislav Zgusta (1924–2007)
 Manfred Mayrhofer (1926–2011)
 Helmut Rix (1926–2004)
 Warren Cowgill (1929–1985)
 Johanna Narten (1930-2019)
 Calvert Watkins (1933–2013)
 Anna Morpurgo Davies (1937-2014)
 Jens Elmegård Rasmussen (1944–2013)
 Jochem Schindler (1944–1994)

Contemporary IE study centres
The following universities have institutes or faculties devoted to IE studies:

Academic publications

Journals 

Kuhn's Zeitschrift KZ since 1852, in 1988 renamed to Historische Sprachforschung HS
Indogermanische Forschungen IF since 1892
Glotta since 1909
Bulletin de la Société de Linguistique de Paris BSL
Die Sprache since 1949
Münchner Studien zur Sprachwissenschaft MSS 1952–
Journal of Indo-European Studies JIES since 1973
Tocharian and Indo-European Studies since 1987
Studia indo-europaea since 2001
International Journal of Diachronic Linguistics and Linguistic Reconstruction IJDL Munich since 2004
Indo-European Linguistics IEUL since 2012

Book series

Leiden Studies in Indo-European, founded 1991
Copenhagen Studies in Indo-European, founded 1999
Leiden Indo-European Etymological Dictionary Series, founded 2005

See also
 Historical linguistics

References

Sources

External links

TITUS gallery of Indo-Europeanists
Collection of articles dealing with the Indo-European studies
The web site of the Indogermanische Gesellschaft, the Society for Indo-European studies
 glottothèque - Ancient Indo-European Grammars online, an online collection of introductory videos to Ancient Indo-European languages produced by the University of Göttingen

 
Studies